Avoca is a small town near Arklow, in County Wicklow, Ireland. It is situated on the River Avoca.

The Avoca area has been associated with its copper mines for many years and the valley has been celebrated by Thomas Moore in the song "The Meeting of the Waters". The name of the song derives from the meeting of the Avonmore and Avonbeg rivers, about 3 kilometres from the village of Avoca. The song is said to have been written under a tree, the stump of which remains by the Meetings. Avoca is also famous for its handweaving, with Avoca Handweavers based there.

Avoca has been used as a filming location for several films and television series. The BBC series Ballykissangel was filmed there. In 1967, Avoca was one of the locations used in the film Jules Verne's Rocket to the Moon, and it was the setting for the comedy film Zonad which had a general Irish release in 2010.

The red kite, recently reintroduced to Ireland, is  now commonly seen in and around Avoca.

Toponymy
Avoca was once known as Newbridge. It subsequently became known as Ovoca, and then in Victorian times as Avoca. Ptolemy mentions the river Oboka on his early map of Ireland. None of the other names is used today.

Mining
Copper mining is reported to have begun in the Avoca River valley around 1720 and it continued, with interruptions, until 1982. Earlier mining, perhaps dating back to the Bronze Age, may have occurred. The East Avoca site, today, is composed mainly of a number of rock waste spoil heaps, abandoned quarries (Cronebane and East Avoca open pits) and disused roads. The largest spoil heap, Mount Platt, was built up from waste rock excavated from Cronebane open pit. There was a mineral tramway built from the West Avoca mines, through the village (on the opposite side of the river) and on to Arklow Harbour. The route of most of this was subsumed into the Dublin-Rosslare railway line, but an arch and a tunnel under the road from Rathdrum to Avoca remains.

Transport
Avoca lies on the R752 regional road linking Rathnew with Woodenbridge. The village is served by Bus Éireann route 133 from Dublin (66 km) and Wicklow (21 km) to Arklow (10 km), with two departures in each direction on Mondays to Saturdays and one each way on Sundays.

There has been some local political pressure to reopen Avoca railway station, from which passenger services were withdrawn on 3 March 1964, almost 101 years after its opening, on the Dublin-Rosslare railway line, on 18 July 1863.

International relations

Avoca has a town twinning agreement with Bromham, Wiltshire in England.

Notable people
 Noel Andrews (1932–2011), Irish radio and television commentator ran The Avoca Inn from 1970-1990
 George Barret Sr. (c. 1730–1784), Irish landscape artist painted at Avoca
 Niall Byrne, guitarist in Irish band The Redneck Manifesto
 Oliver Byrne (1810–1880), civil engineer and author of scientific works was born in the Vale of Avoca
 Harry Harrison (1925–2012), American science fiction author lived in the area in the 1970s
 Lawrence Kavenagh (c. 1810–1846), Irish-Australian convict bushranger was born in either Newbridge (now called Avoca) or nearby Rathdrum
 Pauline Mellon, Irish mathematician was born in the town
 Abraham Mills (c. 1750–1828), English mining company manager and geologist, one of the earliest advocates of investment in Irish gold mining, spent time mining for copper in Avoca
 John O'Hagan (1873–1930), Irish priest who served as Rector of the Pontifical Irish College in Rome from 1919 to 1930 was born in Ballykillageer near the town
 Chris Pontius (b. 1974), American stunt performer and cast member of reality stunt show Jackass lived in the town from 2004–2008
 Donald Pratt (b. 1935), Irish businessman and former first-class cricketer purchased Avoca Handweavers in 1974
 Günther Schütz (1912–1991), German citizen who worked for German Intelligence (Abwehr) during World War II retired in Avoca
 Emily Wynne (1872–1958), Irish author and textile artist worked at Avoca Woollen Mills

See also
 List of towns and villages in Ireland
 Avoca, Victoria, Australia which was named after the Avoca in Wicklow
 The Avoca School, Blackrock, County Dublin

References
Notes

Timothy Alborn, An Irish El Dorado: Recovering Gold in County Wicklow, Journal of British Studies, Vol. 50, No. 2 (April 2011), pp. 359–380. Published by: The University of Chicago Press on behalf of The North American Conference on British Studies. Stable URL: https://www.jstor.org/stable/10.1086/658187. PDF.
Bodkin T. (1920) Four Irish Landscape Painters: George Barret R.A., Irish Academic Press, 2nd ed. 1987.

External links
Avoca Cemetery Headstones
Mining, Metal Resources and Exploration in the Republic of Ireland in German, English summary

Towns and villages in County Wicklow